Hatboalia Higher Secondary School is a secondary school in Alamdanga Upazila, Bangladesh.

History
Hatboalia is the first high school in its area. It was founded in 1925 by Dr. Riaz Uddin.

Notable alumni
 Radhabinod Pal

References

 

Schools in Chuadanga District
High schools in Bangladesh
Educational institutions established in 1925
1925 establishments in India